Von Everett Joshua (born May 1, 1948) is a former professional baseball outfielder for the Los Angeles Dodgers (1969–71, 1973–74 and 1979), San Francisco Giants (1975–76), Milwaukee Brewers (1976–77) and San Diego Padres (1980) of Major League Baseball (MLB).

Playing career
Joshua was drafted out of Chabot College by the San Francisco Giants in the first round of the 1967 January Major League Baseball draft along the likes of Carlton Fisk. However, Joshua signed with the Los Angeles Dodgers.

He helped the Dodgers win the 1974 National League pennant. However, in that year's World Series, which the Oakland Athletics won in five games over the Dodgers, Joshua went 0-for-4, all in pinch-hitting appearances, including grounding out to relief pitcher Rollie Fingers for the final out of the Series.

In 10 seasons he played in 822 games and had 2,234 at bats, 277 runs, 610 hits, 87 doubles, 31 triples, 30 home runs, 184 RBI, 55 stolen bases, 108 walks, .273 batting average, .306 on-base percentage, .380 slugging percentage, 849 total bases, 15 sacrifice hits, 15 sacrifice flies and 20 intentional walks. Defensively, he recorded a career .976 fielding percentage.

Coaching career
Joshua was the hitting coach for the Albuquerque Dukes for several years in the late 1980s. Joshua was the Iowa Cubs hitting coach, then was hitting coach of the Chicago Cubs from June to October 2009, following the firing of Gerald Perry. He was rehired as the Iowa Cubs hitting coach for the 2010 season.

Sources
, or Retrosheet, or Pura Pelota

1948 births
Living people
African-American baseball coaches
African-American baseball players
Albuquerque Dodgers players
Albuquerque Dukes players
American expatriate baseball players in Mexico
Baseball players from Oakland, California
Chabot Gladiators baseball players
Chicago Cubs coaches
Chicago White Sox coaches
Leones de Yucatán players
Los Angeles Dodgers players
Major League Baseball center fielders
Milwaukee Brewers players
Minor league baseball managers
Plataneros de Tabasco players
San Diego Padres players
San Francisco Giants players
Santa Barbara Dodgers players
Spokane Indians players
St. Lucie Legends players
Tigres de Aragua players
American expatriate baseball players in Venezuela
Tigres del México players
Tri-City Atoms players
21st-century African-American people
20th-century African-American sportspeople
Fubon Guardians coaches